Scuticaria is the generic name of two groups of organisms. It can refer to:

Scuticaria (fish), a genus of eels in the family Muraenidae
Scuticaria (plant), a genus of orchids in the family Orchidaceae